Oropouche orthobunyavirus (OROV) is one of the most common orthobunyaviruses. When OROV infects humans, it causes a rapid fever illness called Oropouche fever. OROV was originally reported in Trinidad and Tobago in 1955 from the blood sample of a fever patient and from a pool of Coquillettidia venezuelensis mosquitoes. In 1960, OROV was isolated from a sloth (Bradypus tridactylus) and a pool of Ochlerotatus serratus  mosquitoes in Brazil. The virus is considered a public health threat in tropical and subtropical areas of Central and South America, with over half a million infected people as of 2005. OROV is considered to be an arbovirus due to the method of transmission by the mosquitoes Aedes serratus and Culex quinquefasciatus among sloths, marsupials, primates, and birds.

Epidemic sites
Between 1961 and 1980, OROV was reported in the northern state of Pará, Brazil, and from 1980 to 2004, OROV had spread to the Amazonas, Amapá, Acre, Rondônia, Tocantis, and Maranhão. The virus causes Oropouche fever, an urban arboviral disease that has since resulted in >30 epidemics during 1960–2009.

Virology
Currently, based on the small segment (SRNA) genetic information, there are 4 major genotypes (I–IV) of OROV. Genotype I was isolated from strains in Acre, Amazonas, Maranhão, Tocantis, Pará, Trinidad, and Tobago. Genotype II was obtained during the spread in Amapá, Pará, Rondônia, and Peru. Genotype III was isolated from samples in Acre, Minas Gerais, Panama, and Rondônia. The final genotype IV was isolated from Amazonas.

Dispersion
A possible dispersal could be predicted for the four genotypes based on time-scaled analysis and epidemiologic data association. Genotype I possibly dispersed towards western Pará, Trinidad, and Tobago. After, genotype I progressed towards Amazonas, Acre, Maranhao, and Tocantins. Genotype II possibly emerged in Amapá, Pará, Rondônia, and Peru at the same time. Genotype III emerged in Rondônia, moved towards Panama, Acre, and Maranhão. From Maranhão, the genotype progressed towards Minas Gerais. Finally, genotype IV emerged from the city of Manaus and Amazonas.

Experimentation and research
OROV has been used extensively in testing with HeLa cells to study the mechanisms of apoptosis induced by the virus. It was found that OROV causes apoptosis by DNA fragmentation. In UV-inactivated OROV, virus-receptor binding was not enough and that viral uncoating and replication were needed to induce apoptosis.

References

Orthobunyaviruses